J.J.'s Broadway is an album by jazz trombonist and arranger J. J. Johnson recorded in 1963 for the Verve label.

Reception

The Allmusic review by Scott Yanow observed "This album has some good music, but it will be very difficult to find".

Track listing
 "Lovely" (Stephen Sondheim) - 3:56
 "My Favorite Things" (Richard Rodgers, Oscar Hammerstein II) - 4:17
 "Mira" (Bob Merrill) - 3:23 		
 "Make Someone Happy" (Jule Styne, Betty Comden, Adolph Green) - 3:51
 "Who Will Buy?" (Lionel Bart) - 3:54
 "A Sleepin' Bee" (Harold Arlen, Truman Capote) - 3:54
 "Put on a Happy Face" (Lee Adams, Charles Strouse) - 4:06
 "Nobody's Heart" (Richard Rodgers, Lorenz Hart) - 3:39
 "A Second Chance" (André Previn) - 2:55
 "The Sweetest Sounds" (Rodgers) - 3:28
Recorded in New York City on March 12, 1963 (tracks 1, 3, 5, 6, 8 & 10) and April 6, 1963 (tracks 2, 4, 7 & 9)

Personnel 
J. J. Johnson - trombone, leader
Paul Faulise, Urbie Green, Lou McGarity, Tom Mitchell - trombone  (tracks 1, 3, 5, 6, 8 & 10)
Hank Jones - piano (tracks 2 & 4-8)
Richard Davis (tracks 2, 4, 7 & 9), Chuck Israels (tracks 1, 3, 5, 6, 8 & 10) - bass
Walter Perkins - drums

References 

1963 albums
Verve Records albums
J. J. Johnson albums